48 Hrs. (pronounced 'forty-eight hours') is a 1982 American buddy cop action comedy film directed and co-written by Walter Hill, co-written by Larry Gross, Steven E. de Souza and Roger Spottiswoode, and starring Nick Nolte and Eddie Murphy (in his film debut) as a cop and a convict, respectively, who team up to catch two hardened criminals. The title refers to the amount of time they have to solve the crime. 

Though it is predated by Richard Rush's Freebie and the Bean, the film is often credited as being the first in the "buddy cop" genre, later popularised by films such as Lethal Weapon, Bad Boys and Rush Hour. 48 Hrs. was Joel Silver's first title as a producer. Its supporting cast features Annette O'Toole, James Remar, Frank McRae, David Patrick Kelly, Sonny Landham, Jonathan Banks and Brion James. The musical score was composed by James Horner.

Released by Paramount Pictures on December 8, 1982, 48 Hrs. was one of the most commercially successful films of 1982, and it received widespread acclaim from critics. It launched Murphy's film career, and earned him a Golden Globe Award nomination for New Star of the Year – Actor. A sequel, Another 48 Hrs., was released in 1990, also directed by Walter Hill, with Nolte and Murphy reprising their roles.

Plot
Convicted career criminal Albert Ganz escapes from custody with the help of his accomplice Billy Bear. They travel to San Francisco and kill Henry Wong, a former associate. SFPD Inspector Jack Cates, accompanied by Detectives Algren and Van Zant, trace Ganz and Bear to a hotel, where they've checked in under aliases. Ganz and Bear ambush the officers. In the ensuing shootout, Ganz kills Algren and Van Zant, and escapes with Billy, taking Jack's service revolver.

Armed with a replacement pistol, Jack tracks down Ganz's former partner-in-crime Reggie Hammond, who is in prison with six months to go on a three-year sentence for armed robbery. After a memorable first meeting in prison, Jack manages to get Reggie a 48-hour release in to his custody so that Reggie can help Jack find Ganz and Bear. Reggie leads Jack to an apartment where Ganz's last remaining associate Luther Kelly lives. When Jack looks around, Luther shoots at him and refuses to be interrogated, so Jack arrests Luther. 

That night, Reggie leads Jack to Torchy's, a redneck hangout where Billy used to be a bartender. Reggie, on a challenge from Jack, shakes the bar down using Jack's badge, single-handedly bringing the crowd under his control. They get a lead on Billy's old girlfriend, but get nothing out of her, as the girlfriend says she threw Billy out. After tensions between the two men finally erupt into a fistfight that is stopped by a pair of patrol officers, Reggie finally confesses that he, Ganz, Bear, Luther and Wong had robbed a drug dealer of $500,000 some years earlier and that the money was (and remains) stashed in the trunk of Reggie's car in a downtown parking garage. Instead of splitting the cash, Ganz sold Reggie out, resulting in his incarceration. It was also the reason why Ganz and Billy took Luther's girlfriend Rosalie: they wanted Luther to get Reggie's money in exchange for her safe return.

However, Luther goes and gets the car, and Jack and Reggie tail him to a Muni station where Ganz comes to get the money. Luther, however, recognizes Jack, and Ganz and Billy escape, while Reggie chases after Luther. Left with nothing, Jack ends up going back to the police station and waits for Reggie to call. Jack goes to a nightclub in the Fillmore District, to find Reggie, who has tracked Luther to a hotel across the street. Jack, humbled, apologizes for continuously berating and insulting Reggie. He lends Reggie some money to pay for a hotel room to have sex with a girl he's met, but as Reggie leaves the club with her, he sees Luther leave the hotel. Luther gets onto a stolen bus driven by Billy and hands over the money to Ganz, who shoots Luther and presumably Rosalie. Ganz spots Jack and Reggie following them, and a car chase/gunfight ensues, which ends when Billy forces Jack's Cadillac through the window of a Cadillac showroom.  At this point following a heated verbal thrashing from Jack's superior Haden, Jack and Reggie are ready to resign themselves to the fact that they failed to catch Ganz.

At a local bar, Jack wonders if Billy might go back to see his girl and use her place as a hideout. Jack and Reggie force their way inside and after a brief confrontation Reggie shoots Billy. Ganz escapes into a maze of alleyways, capturing Reggie. Jack approaches and shoots  Ganz in the shoulder, throwing Reggie off him. Ganz then charges at Jack but Jack shoots him repeatedly, killing him. Finally, Jack takes Reggie to go see the girl he had met earlier in Fillmore. Jack leaves the money in Reggie's car, but asks for a loan to buy a convertible when Reggie is released, to which Reggie agrees. Jack gives Reggie a stern warning about changing his ways once he's released, and Reggie agrees to do so, while half attempting to steal Jack's lighter. The two men share a laugh before driving back to the prison.

Cast

 Nick Nolte as San Francisco Police Inspector Jack Cates
 Eddie Murphy as Reggie Hammond
 Annette O'Toole as Elaine Marshall
 Frank McRae as Captain Haden
 James Remar as Albert Ganz
 David Patrick Kelly as Luther Kelly
 Sonny Landham as Billy Bear
 Brion James as Inspector Ben Kehoe
 Kerry Sherman as Rosalie
 Jonathan Banks as Detective Algren
 James Keane as Detective Van Zant
 Tara King as Frizzy
 Greta Blackburn as Lisa
 Margot Rose as Casey
 Denise Crosby as Sally
 Olivia Brown as Candy
 Jack Thibeau as Detective Lloyd
 Clare Nono as Ruth
 Sandy Martin as Officer Kramer
 Chris Mulkey as Officer Bellis
 John Hauk as Henry Wong
 Peter Jason as Torchy's Bartender
 John Dennis Johnston as Torchy's Patron
 Ola Ray as Torchy's Dancer

Production

Development and writing
Lawrence Gordon came up with the original idea for the film. The premise had the Governor of Louisiana's daughter kidnapped by a criminal, who strapped dynamite to her head and threatened to blow her up in 48 hours if the ransom was not met. The meanest cop goes to the worst prison in the state and gets out the most vicious criminal for his knowledge of the kidnapper who was his cellmate. Walter Hill says Gordon may have had the idea as far back as 1971 and a few writers worked on the project. In 1975 Gordon was making Hard Times with writer-director Walter Hill and editor Roger Spottiswoode. Spottiswoode wanted to direct and Hill suggested he break in by writing a script. He did a draft of 48 Hours supervised by Hill for Columbia Pictures, who had financed 48 Hours. Later Tracy Keenan Wynn worked on the script 

The film moved from Columbia to Paramount, who wanted to do a draft for Clint Eastwood. They hired Hill to rewrite the script with Eastwood as the criminal. He did so "but when I turned it in I said that I didn't think it would work," Hill said, adding "that the best idea would be to make Richard Pryor the criminal and have someone like Eastwood play the cop. Back in '78 or '79 no one seemed to think this was such a good idea." Eastwood ended up playing a criminal in Escape from Alcatraz instead. As a result,  48 Hrs. went into limbo for two years. However Gordon and his co-producer Joel Silver did not forget the project. Gordon called Hill and asked him if he would make the film with Nick Nolte as Cates. "Paramount felt that the combination of Nick Nolte and a good black actor would be commercial," said Hill. "What happened is very simple: Richard Pryor is now an enormous movie star, and that's changed everybody's mind about black lead players."

From the start, Hill envisioned a more improvisational film than he'd ever before created. "The story is traditional urban thriller: two terrible guys are out there and have to be brought down," he said. "But even though I enjoy working in genres, the point is always to explode them or give them a transfusion. So I made a very conscious decision to go with the elements of personality of the two players, rather than be overly genuflective to the narrative. Thrusting a white policeman and a black convict together carries so much gravity that we didn't have to beat the white-black thing to death. If it works, it's because of the actors' personalities." Hill's first choice after Richard Pryor was Gregory Hines. When he was not available, Hill's then-girlfriend Hildy Gottlieb recommended her client, Eddie Murphy, then best known for his work on Saturday Night Live. The character of Reggie Hammond was originally named Willie Biggs, but Eddie Murphy felt that was too stereotypical of a black man's name and changed it to Reggie Hammond.

Steven E. de Souza worked on the script for a few weeks after Eddie Murphy was cast. Critic Michael Sragow says "The producers recommended de Souza to Hill because they thought he'd be good at adding a light touch to the action. Hill didn't find de Souza fast enough or his style of comic writing appropriate to the movie; he thought the writer contributed gags instead of personality touches (very few of which were used), and he just didn't develop the rapport with de Souza that he'd later have with Gross." Hill brought on Larry Gross to work on the script three weeks prior to shooting. He told Gross "I've been working this fella and while I like em I know it's not gonna work out...." and called the film "a shaggy dog story.  Defiant Ones plus chuckles."

Sragow says, "Hill has been known throughout his career for defining character through action rather than psychological banter, but he knew that this movie would be more of a character piece than a plot picture, and he wanted a writer who'd challenge his own habits and assumptions. Throughout filming, Hill joked that he waved the flag called "myth and archetype"-trying to play off the folkloric expectations an audience might have for a big blonde hero like Nick Nolte-while Larry Gross waved a flag called "social and psychological realism." The writers' relationship became so symbiotic that Gross often found Hill coming down on the side of S&PR and Gross defending the prerogatives of M&A."

Gross says his main contributions were: the idea that Reggie Hammond wanted badly to have sex after three years in prison; Nick Nolte having a relationship with his girlfriend that mirrored the frustration Eddie was having; improving "the nuances of the relationships between Nick and his girl, his boss and the killers. The killers were sharpened up and made more interesting... Whenever Walter could invent a monologue for one of the women (all bit parts), he would." Gross thought Hill has received "a bum rap on the woman question." "One of the things I think makes 48 HRS. really more interesting than the average kind of movie like this," says its co-writer, "is that, although women play relatively small roles in the narrative, they kind of haunt everyone's imagination. The film really is sort of a screwball comedy about men and women trying to get together and not getting together, even though it is a very conventional gangster piece. "People had this perception of Walter being melancholy," Gross said. "And now that he's made this film no one thinks he's melancholy any more."

Filming
Filming started on May 17, 1982. The film was shot on-location in San Francisco and Los Angeles. 

Murphy started a few weeks after principal photography began because he was finishing up a season of Saturday Night Live. The shoot went well but Hill ran into problems with studio executives. Michael Eisner, then head of Paramount, was worried that the film was not funny enough. Hill and his co-screenwriter, Larry Gross wrote more material tailored to Nolte's and Murphy's personalities. By Hill's account, they rewrote Murphy's character right to the very last day of shooting. Executives also found the footage of the gunfight in the hotel to be too violent and were worried that it would kill the film's humor. They told Hill that he would never work for Paramount again as a result. Actor Chris Mulkey, said it was widely known on set that Paramount executives hated what they had seen of Murphy's performance in dailies and wanted to fire him, but Nolte and Hill fought to keep him. Mulkey remembered Murphy as a diligent performer who was open to suggestion and stuck to the script.

In 2008, co-writer Larry Gross's contemporaneous diary of his days on set was published on the MovieCityNews website.

Music
In January 2011, Intrada Records released the world-premiere recording of James Horner's score and songs from the movie in a limited-edition run of 5,000 units. This was the first official release of the score; previous pressings from Europe were unofficial bootlegs with music from other James Horner film scores.

Reception

Box office
48 Hrs. opened in the United States on Wednesday, December 8, 1982, with its first weekend the same as The Toy and Airplane II: The Sequel and finished behind them in third place for the weekend with a gross of $4,369,868 from 850 screens, and had a gross of $5,273,192 from its first 5 days. The film grossed $78,868,508 overall at the U.S. and Canada box office, surpassing their combined box-office, to become the seventh highest-grossing film of 1982.

Critical response

48 Hrs. received critical acclaim and is considered by many as one of the best films of 1982. On Rotten Tomatoes, the film has a 94% approval rating, based on 47 reviews, with an average rating of 7.3/10. The site's critical consensus reads, "Marking an auspicious feature film debut for Eddie Murphy, 48 Hrs. is a briskly paced action comedy that succeeds largely due to the outstanding chemistry between its two leads". On Metacritic, the film has a score of 71 out of 100, based on 8 critics, indicating "generally favorable reviews". In 2007, the staff at IGN named the movie the third-greatest buddy cop film.

Awards and nominations

Sequel and remakes 
A sequel, Another 48 Hrs., was released in 1990. Walter Hill returned to direct, and Nolte, Murphy, James and McRae all reprised their roles. The film failed to replicate the success of its predecessor, and received negative reviews.

A Hindi-language Indian remake, Andar Baahar, was released in 1984, with Jackie Shroff and Anil Kapoor in the lead roles. A Kannada-language remake, Police File, was released in 1992

In 2017, the Safdie brothers announced they would helm a remake and co-write the script with Jerrod Carmichael. In December 2019, the Safdies stated they reworked their script into a separate original idea. As of 2022, the film has not been produced.

See also

 List of American films of 1982

References

External links

 
 
 
 
 Larry Gross' 48 Hrs. Diaries, Part 1, Part 2, Part 3, Part 4, Part 5, Part 6, Part 7, Part 8, Part 9, and Part 10

1982 films
1982 comedy films
1980s action comedy films
1980s buddy comedy films
1980s buddy cop films
1980s crime comedy films
1980s English-language films
1980s police procedural films
1980s American films
American action comedy films
American buddy comedy films
American buddy cop films
American crime comedy films
American police detective films
Fictional portrayals of the San Francisco Police Department
Films directed by Walter Hill
Films produced by Joel Silver
Films scored by James Horner
Films set in San Francisco
Films set in the San Francisco Bay Area
Films shot in San Francisco
Films with screenplays by Walter Hill
Films with screenplays by Steven E. de Souza
Paramount Pictures films